The following highways are numbered 401:

Canada
British Columbia Highway 401 (former)
Manitoba Provincial Road 401
 Ontario Highway 401

Costa Rica
 National Route 401

Japan
 Japan National Route 401

Norway
 Norwegian County Road 401

Thailand
 Thailand Route 401

United States
  U.S. Route 401
 Florida:
  Florida State Road 401
  County Road 401 (Brevard County, Florida)
  Georgia State Route 401 (unsigned designation for Interstate 75)
  Kentucky Route 401
  Nevada State Route 401
 New York:
  New York State Route 401 (former)
  County Route 401 (Albany County, New York)
  North Carolina Highway 401 (former)
  Pennsylvania Route 401
    Pennsylvania Route 401 Alternate Truck
  Puerto Rico Highway 401
  Rhode Island Route 401
  Virginia State Route 401
  Washington State Route 401